Progress is advancement to a higher or more developed state. 

Progress or PROGRESS may also refer to:

Architecture
 Progress Energy Center for the Performing Arts, in Raleigh, North Carolina
 Progress Energy Park, a baseball stadium in St. Petersburg, Florida
 Progress Theatre, a theatre in Berkshire, England

Arts, entertainment and media

Books
Progress, a 2015 book by Fran Lebowitz
Progress: Ten Reasons to Look Forward to the Future, 2016 book by Johan Norberg

Music

Albums
Progress (Big Youth album), 1979
Progress (EP), an EP by Pedro the Lion
Progress (Michael Giles album)
Progress (Rx Bandits album), 2001
Progress (Show-Ya album)
Progress (Take That album)
Progress (Ultraspank album)

Songs
"Progress" (song), a 2011 song by Ayumi Hamasaki
"Progress", a 1967 song by The Pretty Things recorded for Emotions
"Progress", a 1980 song by Orchestral Manoeuvres in the Dark from Organisation
"Progress", a 1984 song by Nik Kershaw included on The Best of Nik Kershaw
"Progress", a 1987 song by Neurosis from Pain of Mind
"Progress", a 1990 song by Midnight Oil from Essential Oils
"Progress", a song by Kokua from "Progress" single (2006) and Progress album (2016)

Other arts, entertainment and media
"Progress" (Star Trek: Deep Space Nine), a TV series episode
Progress Wrestling, an English professional wrestling promotion
Progress, a 1984 play by Doug Lucie

Business
PROGRESS, a German film distributor
Progress Energy Inc, an American power generation and distribution company
Progress Energy Resources, a Canadian subsidiary of Malaysian oil and gas company Petronas
Progress Publishers, a Moscow-based Soviet publisher
Progress Software Corporation, the creator of Progress 4GL
Progress State Research and Production Rocket Space Center, a Samara-based Russian space company
Ivchenko-Progress, a Ukrainian aero-engine manufacturer

Computer science
Progress 4GL, now known as OpenEdge Advanced Business Language, a programming language developed by Progress Software
Progress indicator, a component in a user interface to convey the progress of a task

Geography

United States
Progress, Indiana
Progress, Mississippi
Progress, Oregon
Progress, Pennsylvania
Progress, Texas
Progress Village, Florida

Elsewhere
Progress Station, Antarctica
Rural Municipality of Progress No. 351, Saskatchewan, Canada
Progress, Chüy, Kyrgyzstan
Progress, Russia, several inhabited localities in Russia

Politics and government
 Progressive Britain, formerly known as Progress (organisation), a political think-tank associated with the right-wing of the British Labour Party
Progress Party (disambiguation)
Royal progress, a formal tour of the state by its monarch

Transportation
Progress (spacecraft), a Russian expendable unmanned freighter spacecraft
Progress (train), which ran between Prague, Czechoslovakia, and the German Democratic Republic
Progress D-27, a 1980s propfan engine developed in the USSR
Progress, formerly known as Sea Serpent clippership (1850–1891, lost at sea)

Other uses
Progress (evolution), the idea that there is a largest-scale trend in evolution of organisms and that the trend is toward improvement or adaptation to changing environmental conditions
 PROGRESS (study), a trial study of perindopril and indapamide

See also

Progressed (EP), by Take That
 
 Progres (disambiguation)